John Edward Davidson (born 23 October 1964) is a Welsh former cricketer.

Davidson was born at Aberystwyth in October 1964. He later studied at Trinity College, Cambridge. While studying at Cambridge, he made his debut in first-class cricket for Cambridge University against Surrey at Fenner's in 1985. He played first-class cricket for Cambridge until 1987, making fourteen appearances. Playing as a right-arm fast-medium bowler, he took 38 wickets at an average of 36.97 and best figures of 5 for 35. One of two five wicket hauls he took, these figures came against Hampshire in 1986. As a lower order batsman, he scored 139 runs at a batting average of 12.63, with best a high score of 41 not out. He also made a first-class appearance for a combined Oxford and Cambridge Universities cricket team against the touring New Zealanders in 1986. In addition to playing first-class cricket while at Cambridge, he also made seven List A one-day appearances for the Combined Universities cricket team in the 1986 and 1987 Benson & Hedges Cup's.

References

External links

1964 births
Living people
Sportspeople from Aberystwyth
Alumni of Trinity College, Cambridge
Welsh cricketers
Cambridge University cricketers
British Universities cricketers
Oxford and Cambridge Universities cricketers